Ligota is a common name for villages in Western Poland.  The word, related to Czech: lhóta (free or grace period), refers to the medieval custom of village founders being exempt from paying duties to their lords for a period of 5–8 years.

Villages throughout Poland and other parts of Central Europe have variants of this name.

See:  for a list of locations that include "Ligota" as part of their name.

The Official Polish Register of Territorial Divisions (TERYT, Krajowy Rejestr Urzędowy Podziału Terytorialnego Kraju) lists 8 primary places with the name Ligota:
 Ligota, Silesian Voivodeship (south Poland)
 Ligota, Góra County in Lower Silesian Voivodeship (south-west Poland)
 Ligota, Trzebnica County in Lower Silesian Voivodeship (south-west Poland)
 Ligota, Łask County in Łódź Voivodeship (central Poland)
 Ligota, Sieradz County in Łódź Voivodeship (central Poland)
 Ligota, Ostrów Wielkopolski County in Greater Poland Voivodeship (west-central Poland)
 Ligota, Ostrzeszów County in Greater Poland Voivodeship (west-central Poland)
 Ligota, Opole Voivodeship (south-west Poland)

and 3 parts of places with the name Ligota:
 Ligota (colony in Sieradz County) in Łódź Voivodeship (central Poland)
 Ligota (Biskupice), part of the village of Biskupice, Miechów County in Lesser Poland Voivodeship (south Poland)
 Ligota (Kępiński county) a hamlet in Greater Poland Voivodeship (west-central Poland)

In addition, there are a number of places not included in the TERYT:
 Ligota (Katowice) part of Katowice in Silesian Voivodeship (south Poland)
 Ligota - Ligocka Kuźnia part of Rybnik in Silesian Voivodeship (south Poland)
 Ligota (Wrocław) a housing estate in Wrocław in Lower Silesian Voivodeship (south-west Poland)

See also  

 Ellguth (disambiguation)
 Lehota
 Lgota
 Lhota
 Wola (settlement)
 Sloboda, a similar concept in Russian history